Daylight is the fourth album by American singer-songwriter Duncan Sheik. It was released on Atlantic Records in 2002.

Details
The Japanese version included the song "Lost On The Moon" as a bonus track, while a special tour version was released in 2004 with a bonus disc, which included live versions of "Barely Breathing" and "Half-Life", alternate versions of "Bite Your Tongue" and "On a High", and a remix of "Reasons For Living".

"Half-Life" was also featured in the 2003 film What a Girl Wants.

Reception

The album was met with moderate commercial success and favorable reviews. Review aggregating website Metacritic reports a normalized score of 71% based on 7 reviews. Entertainment Weekly wrote that "the silky-voiced folk-popster successfully rocks up his sound on his fourth album, adding a polite but firm electric edge".

Track listing
"Genius" – 3:43
"Half-Life" – 3:59
"Start Again" – 3:55
"On Her Mind" – 4:11
"Such Reveries" – 5:00
"On a High" – 3:36
"Magazines" – 3:47
"For You" – 2:11
"Good Morning!" – 4:04
"Memento" – 3:47
"Shine Inside" – 10:19

 Note: The American version of the album features the song "Chimera" after "Shine Inside" as part of the final track (6 minutes and 28 seconds into the track).

References

External links
 

2003 albums
Duncan Sheik albums
Albums produced by Patrick Leonard
Atlantic Records albums